Dong Guishan (born July 1946) is a retired lieutenant general in the People's Liberation Army (PLA) of the People's Republic of China, who served as commander of the PLA Tibet Military District from 2004 to 2008.

Biography
Born in Xiping County, Henan Province, Dong joined the People's Liberation Army (PLA) in December 1964, and the Chinese Communist Party (CCP) in January 1966. He has served in various posts in Tibet Military District during his career, and was elevated to vice chief of staff of the region in June 1988. He was promoted to vice commander of the region in November 1991. He studied at the Nanjing Military Academy in January 1982, and at the PLA Military Direction Academy from September 1984 to July 1986. In October 1998, he became the director of the Armament Department of the PLA Chengdu Military Region. In August 2004, he was appointed commander of the Tibet Military District. From November 2004 to October 2006 he was also a standing committee member of the CCP Tibet Autonomous Regional Committee. He became a lieutenant general in July 2006.

He was a member of the 17th Central Committee of the Chinese Communist Party.

References

1946 births
Living people
People's Liberation Army generals from Henan
People from Zhumadian
People's Republic of China politicians from Henan
Chinese Communist Party politicians from Henan